Iain Ellis Hamilton (6 June 1922 – 21 July 2000) was a Scottish composer.

Hamilton was born in Glasgow, but was educated in London, where he became an apprentice engineer. He remained in that profession for the next seven years. He undertook the study of music in his spare time. After winning a scholarship to study at the Royal College of Music, which he entered in 1947, he decided to devote himself to a musical career. 

He earned the Bachelor of Music degree from the University of London and was awarded an honorary Doctorate of Music from the University of Glasgow. Hamilton moved to the United States in 1962, but died in London, aged 78.

Works

Chamber and solo instrument
Antigone for Wind Octet (1991)
Aria for Horn and Piano
Brass Quintet (by 1991) 
Capriccio for Trumpet and Piano
Five Scenes for Trumpet and Piano (1966)
Hyperion for Five Players (1977) (Cl., Hn., Vln., Vcl., Pno.)
In Summer for Oboe and Piano (1999)
Octet for Paragon Ensemble (Fl., Ob., Cl., Bsn., Hn., Tpt., Tbn., Bar.)
Octet for Strings for Double String Quartet (1954)
Quartet, Op. 12 for Flute and String Trio (1951)
Quartet for Piano with String Quartet (1993–98) 
Quintet No. 1 for Clarinet and String Quartet (1948)
Quintet for Piano with String Quartet (1993) 
Sea Music: Quintet No. 2 for Clarinet and String Quartet (1974)
Serenata for Violin and Clarinet (1955)
Sextet for Flute, Two Clarinets, Violin, Cello and Piano
Sonata for Clarinet and Piano, Op. 22 (1955)
Sonata for Five for Flute, Oboe, Clarinet, Bassoon and Horn (1966)
Sonata for Flautist and Piano (1966)
Sonata for Oboe and Piano (1991)
Sonata for Viola and Piano, Op. 9 (1950–1) 
Sonata No. 1 for Violin and Piano (1974)
Sonata No. 1 for Violoncello and Piano, Op. 39 (1958–59) 
Sonata No. 2 for Violoncello and Piano (1974)
Sonata Notturna for Horn and Piano
Spirits of the Air for Solo Bass Trombone (1977)
Spring Days for Flute and Piano (1996)
String Quartet No. 1, op. 5 (by 1952) 
String Quartet No. 2 (by 1965–71) 
String Quartet No. 3 for String Quartet (1984)
String Quartet No. 4 for String Quartet (1984) 
String Sextet (1988) (2Vln., 2Vla., 2Vcl.)
The Chaining of Prometheus for Band or Large Wind Ensemble (1963)
Three Nocturnes for Clarinet and Piano, Op.6
Trio for Violin, Cello and Piano, Op. 25 (1956) 
Wild Garden Five Pieces for Clarinet and Piano

Choral
A Hymn to the Virgin (SATB and Pno.)
Christ's Nativity for SATB and Organ (1989)
Cradle Song for SATB and Piano
Epitaph for This World and Time
Mass in A (1980) (SSATTB, a cappella)
Nocturnal for SATB Chorus
Prometheus for Soprano, Mezzo, Tenor and Baritone Soloists, SATB Chorus and Orchestra (1986)
Requiem for Mixed Chorus, a cappella (1979)
Te Deum, Homage to Venice for Mixed Chorus, Wind Ensemble and Percussion (1973–1974)
The for Mixed Chorus and 10 Winds (Poems by Henry Vaughan)
The Bermudas for Baritone, SATB Chorus, and Orchestra, Op. 33 (1957) 
The Bright Heavens Sounding (1985) (SATB Soloists and Chorus, Fl., 2 Ob., Bsn., 2 Hn., 2 Tpt. in C, Str.)
The Convergence of the Twain for SATB and Piano (1985)
The Descent of the Celestial City from "Epitaph For This World And Time" (1972) (SATB and Org.)
The Fray of Support for SATB Chorus, a cappella, Op. 21
The Golden Sequence (1973) (SATB Chorus, Congregation and Organ)
The Passion of Our Lord According to Saint Mark (1982) (SATB Soloists, Chorus and Orchestra)
The Summer Fields Six Sonnets of John Clare
Midsummer
Careless Rambles
Summer Happiness
The Heat of Noon
The Nightingale
Twilight in Summer
To Columbus (1975) (Mixed Chorus, 3Tpt., 3Tbn., 3Perc.)
Vespers, 1980 (1980) (Mixed Chorus, 2Pno., Hp., Perc.)

Orchestral
"1912", a light overture, op. 38 (by 1958) 
1912 (1963) (rescoring of the overture "1912" for concert band) 
Alastor for Orchestra (1970)
Amphion Concerto No. 2 for Violin and Orchestra (1971)
Arias for Chamber Orchestra
Aurora for Orchestra (1975)
Bartholomew Fair Overture for Orchestra, Op. 17
Bulgaria: Invocation / Evocation for Orchestra (1999)
Cantos for Orchestra
Circus for Two Trumpets and Orchestra (1969)
Concerto for Clarinet and Orchestra, Op. 7 (by 1950–1) 
Concerto for Organ and Orchestra (1964) 
Concerto for Violin and Orchestra, Op. 15
Cleopatra Dramatic Scene for Soprano and Orchestra (1977)
Commedia Concerto for Orchestra (1972)
Concerto for Harp and Small Orchestra (1992)
Ecossaise for Orchestra
In Changing Light Four Impressions for Orchestra (1993)
Jazz Trumpet Concerto for Jazz Trumpet and Orchestra, Op. 37
Jubilee for Orchestra
London: Kaleidoscope for Piano and Orchestra
Piano Concerto No. 1 for Piano and Orchestra (1967)
Piano Concerto No. 2 for Piano and Orchestra (by 1987–8)
Scottish Dances for Orchestra, Op. 32
Sinfonia for Two Orchestras
Sinfonia concertante for Violin, Viola and Chamber Orchestra
Sonata for Chamber Orchestra, Op. 34
Sonatas and Variants for Orchestra
Sonatas and Variants for 10 Winds (1966) series)
Symphonic Variations for Orchestra, Op. 19
Symphony No. 1 "Cyrano de Bergerac" (1948–1949) 
Symphony No. 2 (1951)
Symphony No. 3 in G "Spring" for Orchestra (1981)
Symphony No. 4 in B for Orchestra (1979–1981) 
The Alexandrian Sequence for Chamber Orchestra (1976)
The Transit of Jupiter for Orchestra (1995)
Variations on an Original Theme for Strings, Op. 1
Voyage for Horn and Chamber Orchestra (1970)

Organ
A Vision of Canopus for Organ Solo (1975)
Aubade for Organ Solo (1965)
Fanfares and Variants for Organ Solo
Le Tombeau de Bach Eight Reflections on Six Chorales for Organ Solo (1986)
Paraphrase Based on the music for organs in "Epitaph for This World and Time" (1970)
Roman Music for Organ Solo
Threnos: In Time of War for Organ Solo (1966)

Piano
A Book Of Watercolours for Piano Solo (1993)
A Field of Butterflies for Piano Solo (1990)
Denislav's Diary: Scenes from Childhood for Piano Solo (1995)
Le Jardin de Monet Nine Movements for Piano Solo (1986)
Months and Metamorphoses Volume 1: January, February, March, April
Months and Metamorphoses Volume 2: May, June, July August
Months and Metamorphoses Volume 3: September, October, November, December
Nocturnes with Cadenzas for Piano
Palinodes for Piano Solo (1972)
Sonata No. 1 for Piano Solo (1951, rev. 1971)
Sonata No. 2 for Piano Solo (1973)
Sonata No. 3 for Piano Solo (1978)
Three Piano Pieces, Op. 30

Stage and opera
Agamemnon (1987)
Anna Karenina (1978)
Lancelot (1982–1983)
London's Fair (1992)
On the Eve (1980–1996)
Pharsalia (Dramatic Commentary) (1968)
Raleigh's Dream  (1983)
Tamberlaine (lyric drama for radio) (1976)
The Catiline Conspiracy (1973)
The Royal Hunt of the Sun (1968)
The Tragedy of Macbeth (1994)

Vocal
A Testament of War for Baritone and Orchestra
Cantata No. 1 for Tenor and Piano (1957)
Dialogues for Soprano and Five Instruments
Five Love Songs for High Voice and Orchestra, Op. 36
Five Lyrics of Torquato Tasso for Baritone and Piano (1973)
Love is Life's Spring Setting of a poem by John Clare for Soprano and Piano
Paris de Crépuscule à l'aube Six settings of Baudelaire for Voice and Orchestra
Ricordanza for High Voice and Orchestra (1981)
Songs of Summer for High Voice and Piano (1954)
The Spirit of Delight Songs of Life, Love and Death (1978)

References 

 Iain Hamilton web-page at Theodore Presser Company
 Iain Hamilton web-page at MusicWeb International
  Catalog of papers, including worklist, list of sketched works, letters, etc.

Bibliography

External links
Iain Hamilton interview, 26 July 1991
Iain Hamilton's page at Theodore Presser Company

1922 births
2000 deaths
20th-century classical composers
20th-century British composers
20th-century British male musicians
20th-century Scottish musicians
British male classical composers
Scottish classical composers
Scottish opera composers
Alumni of the Royal Academy of Music
Alumni of the University of London
Male opera composers
Musicians from Glasgow
British expatriates in the United States